In Tua Nua are an Irish rock band. Their name is a phonetic spelling of the Irish Gaelic An Tuath Nua, meaning "the new tribe."

Biography 
The group was formed by Leslie Dowdall, Jack Dublin, Vinnie Kilduff, Ivan O'Shea, Martin Clancy, Paul Byrne and Steve Wickham in the early 1980s. Although the group's focus was an early Roxy Music-style rock, it combined this aspiration with modern-styled folk and traditional Irish music in the form of uillean pipes and acoustic guitars, laced together with raw vocals and electronic violin.

In 1984, the band were the first to sign to U2's Mother label and released their first single "Coming Thru". Shortly afterwards Island Records signed the band. A number of singles were released and a debut album recorded. The first Island single was the critically acclaimed "Take My Hand", co-written by a young Sinéad O'Connor. This was followed by a second single, a cover of Jefferson Airplane's hit "Somebody to Love".

In 1985, Steve Wickham left to join forces with The Waterboys and Island dropped the band. The album recorded for Island remains unreleased. A compilation album of singles and b-sides was released in Italy under the title Somebody to Love.

Vinnie Kilduff also departed from the band around this time. The remaining members recruited replacements – Aingeala de Burca on violin and Brian O'Briain on uilleann pipes.

On 17 May 1986, the new look in Tua Nua played the Self Aid concert. Newly signed to Virgin Records the band released "Seven into the Sea", one of their most popular recordings. An album Vaudeville was released in early 1987.

After touring to promote the album the band reconvened to record a follow-up. Shortly after the recording was completed both de Burca and O'Shea decided to leave. Two new recruits were found – Alicia 'Lovely' Previn on violin and Matt Spalding on bass – and The Long Acre was released in 1988. It spawned two radio hits "All I Wanted" and "Don't Fear Me Now". "All I Wanted" peaked at No. 69 in the UK Singles Chart in May 1988. A third single from the album, "Wheel of Evil", was also released.

The band went to Los Angeles, California to record a third album for Virgin. After the recording was finished the band split, and Virgin did not immediately release the finished product. Both Vaudeville and The Long Acre were made available on iTunes in 2006, and the unreleased third album called When Night Came Down on Sunset was eventually released through iTunes in September 2007.

Although officially disbanded in 1990, some original members reformed in 2004 to occasionally play live together again. In 2010 M.P. & Records, Italy released Vaudeville and The Long Acre re-mastered with bonus tracks on CD (five bonus tracks on "Vaudeville" and three bonus tracks on "The Long Acre"). Both albums are distributed by G.T. Music Distribution.

Leslie Dowdall continues to perform, be it solo or guesting with other Irish and international singers. She released two well-received solo albums in the 1990s; No Guilt, No Guile and Out There.

Paul Byrne and Jack Dublin still play together as the rhythm section in Rocky de Valera and The Gravediggers. Byrne manages the Irish band Von Shakes, while Dublin is the main songwriter for the Dublin band Audiokiss. In late 2010, they also played several shows as part of a band backing Pogues frontman, Shane MacGowan.

Discography

Albums
 Vaudeville (1987; Virgin)
 The Long Acre (1988; Virgin)
 When Night Came Down On Sunset (2007; self-released)

Singles

References

External links
In Tua Nua website
Homepage of lead singer Leslie Dowdall
In Tua Nua entry in The Irish Punk & New Wave Discography
Emigrant.ie

Irish folk rock groups
Irish alternative rock groups
Musical groups from County Dublin
Musical groups established in 1982
Musical groups disestablished in 1990
Musical groups reestablished in 2004